De Caro & Kaplen, LLP, is a New York-based law firm founded in 1982.  The organization is one of the most prominent law firms in the U.S. to specialize in brain injury cases, including representing the Brain Injury Association of America as amicus counsel in opposition to the NFL brain injury class action settlement.

History

The firm was founded by Michael Kaplen and Shana De Caro who have published numerous scholarly works on brain injury law. The firm also specializes in legal advocacy concerning vehicle collisions, construction site accidents, and medical malpractice.

Brain Injury Advocacy 
The firm represented the Brain Injury Association of America as Amicus Counsel in opposing the National Football League class action concussion settlement before the Third Circuit, United States Court of Appeals and the United States Supreme Court. In January 2021, firm partner Shana De Caro was elected as Chairwoman of the board of directors of the Brain Injury Association of America. De Caro was re-elected for a second term in January 2022.

Brain Injury Identification Card 
In January 2018, the firm launched a free identification card for brain injury survivors. In March 2022, the firm announced that they had processed applications from over 25,000 individuals.

Traumatic Brain Injury Scholarship 
Since 2017, De Caro & Kaplen have awarded an annual scholarship of $1,000 to a student who has survived traumatic brain injury, and is pursuing a college education. In 2018, the scholarship was awarded to Baker College student Tiffany Oliverio, who survived a traumatic brain injury suffered in a 2016 car accident in Fenton, Michigan.

In October 2019, the firm announced California art student Fierro Rios as the recipient of their 2019 scholarship award.

In November 2020, the firm announced Coastal Carolina University student Hannah Mead as the recipient of their 2020 scholarship award.

In November 2021, the firm announced Nevada resident Devin Valencia as the recipient of their 2021 scholarship award.

The Invisible Rain Cloud 
In January 2019, the firm published an animated video titled "The Invisible Rain Cloud" which explains what it is like to live with a brain injury. By the end of January 2019, the video had been viewed over 11,000 times on the firm's YouTube channel.

In July 2019, De Caro & Kaplen, LLP published a follow-up video titled "Living With A Stranger", which focused on a spouse's experience of traumatic brain injury. On July 30th 2019, the video was shared in a Facebook post by the Brain Injury Association of America.

In March 2020, the firm published a third video in the series, which highlighted the impact of traumatic brain injury on children and their families. The video, titled "The Little Bird Who Forgot How To Fly: Caring For A Child With Traumatic Brain Injury", features on the website of The Brain Injury Association of America.

Youth Tackle Football 
In October 2019, Michael Kaplen read a prepared statement to the New York State Assembly's health committee during a public hearing on Assembly Bill A02692. If enacted, the bill would prohibit children twelve years old and younger from playing tackle football in New York State. Kaplen's statement was posted in full on the firm's website. The firm maintains a web page which tracks proposed legislation in youth tackle football across the United States.

Brain Injury in the Military 
The firm has spoken out against President Trump’s statements on brain injuries sustained by military personnel in Iraq.

References

Law firms based in New York City